The Joe Foss Institute is a nonprofit organization in the United States that aims to promote an appreciation among students for the American tradition of liberty, the country's military history, and patriotic values. It was founded in 2001 by flying ace and politician Joe Foss, and is headquartered in Scottsdale, Arizona. The institute lists its five values as freedom, patriotism, integrity, service, and character, and targets its programs at military veterans, students, and teachers. The Joe Foss Institute states that its mission is simply “promoting an emphasis on civic education in schools”.

Since its founding in 2001, the Institute has served nearly 1.5 million students through in-classroom presentations, educational materials and scholarships.

Stated Goals

The Institute engages veterans and teachers across America to educate the country's youth on history and civics, and inspire them to become responsible and engaged citizens.

History

The Institute was founded in 2001 by Medal of Honor recipient General Joseph J. Foss and his wife Donna Foss. Throughout his high profile career, General Foss always made time to visit classrooms and speak with the students – America's future leaders. His goal was to ensure the children understand America's freedoms and the importance of public service, integrity and patriotism.

The Joe Foss Institute was created to carry on that vision by offering free educational programs and curriculum for schools and youth groups nationwide. General Foss recognized the importance of preparing our children to be informed and engaged citizens.

Organization Operations

The Joe Foss Institute offers free educational programs for teachers around the country. Currently, the Institute offers three primary programs; Veterans Inspiring Patriotism, "You are America" Civics Series and the Joe Foss Institute Scholarship Program. The Institute has co-sponsored programs with the Bill of Rights Institute and the Boy Scouts of America.

Stars in Service

The Institute holds an annual Stars in Service event to honor national heroes, educators and public servants. Traditionally held in Arizona,  honorees, presenters and speakers have included; Dr. Charles Krauthammer, Carl Bernstein, Tom Brokaw, Richard Dreyfuss, Gary Sinise, Joe Mantegna, General Jerry Boykin, General Michael Moseley, Dr. Craig Barrett, Ross Perot, Jr., and Medal of Honor recipients Sammy L. Davis and Mike Thornton.

References

External links 
 Joe Foss Institute

501(c)(3) organizations
Organizations established in 2001